The Elk City Daily News is a five-day daily newspaper published Tuesday through Friday and Sunday. The newspaper has been in publication since 1901, six years prior to Oklahoma statehood. The publication was previously owned by several members of the Wade Family of Elk City, including Elizabeth Wade (2011-2018), Larry R. Wade  (1969 - 2011), and Paul R. Wade (193x - 1972).

References

Newspapers published in Oklahoma